Ahmar Bel Khat Al Areed is a talk show that discusses a variety of controversial social and human issues airing on the Lebanese Broadcasting Corporation, a privately owned television station in Lebanon. The flagship show which premiered on March 19, 2008, has become a weekly rendezvous for its vast audience. It approaches taboos and controversies, through conversations with people who have gone through these experiences. The weekly program airs every Wednesday at 9.30 KSA. It brings together guests from Lebanon and the Arab world sharing their testimonies with famous host Malek Maktabi who in turn highlights solutions with experts from different fields.

Criticism
Ahmar Bel Khat Al Areed has been criticized by Arab conservatives to surface issues that are not to be made public according to traditional Arab beliefs. 
Mazen Abdul Jawad, a Saudi Arabian man, was sentenced to 5 years of prison and 1000 lashes on charges related to immoral behavior. During an episode discussing “sexual pleasure”, Mazen Abdul Jawad spoke about picking up women and displayed his vast collection of sex toys on camera. This episode became highly polemic in the Arab World, driving the Saudi Arabian government to force shut LBC offices in the Kingdom.

Malek Maktabi also tackled the question “Is he your biological father?”  during one of the episodes. This episode caused a shock in Arab societies.  During the show, the guests waited impatiently to finally know the truth about their parentage. Andre Mkarbane a Professor in genetic diseases declared the results which were analyzed several times to reach an accurate answer.

External links
 http://www.dailystar.com.lb/News/Local-News/Nov/16/LBCs-Bold-Red-Line-sex-braggart-appeals-jail-sentence.ashx#axzz1TySjQTj0
 https://web.archive.org/web/20111007143513/http://www.wikeez.com/en/tv-shows/rosanna-after-royal-pardon-lbc-offended-my-religion-and-abused-me
 https://web.archive.org/web/20111007143551/http://www.wikeez.com/en/tv-shows/ahmar-bil-khat-al-arid-fights-back-its-3rd-season-5598
 http://www.lbci.com/ahmar
 http://news.bbc.co.uk/2/hi/middle_east/8295020.stm
 https://web.archive.org/web/20111007143623/http://www.wikeez.com/en/tv-shows/ahmar-bel-khat-al-arid-saudi-court-overrule-mazen-abed-al-jawad-s-appeal-6424
 https://web.archive.org/web/20111007143654/http://www.wikeez.com/en/tv-shows/ahmar-bil-khat-al-arid-another-law-suit-way-5719

Television talk shows
Lebanese television series
2000s Lebanese television series
2010s Lebanese television series
Lebanese Broadcasting Corporation International original programming